Universal City may refer to:

Cities
 Universal City, California
 Universal City, Texas

Entertainment industry
 the original promotional name for the Universal Studios Lot that replaced Universal’s “Old Ranch”
 Universal City Studios, an alternate name of Universal Studios
 Universal City Records

Train stations
 Universal City/Studio City (Los Angeles Metro station), for Universal Studios Hollywood in California
 Universal City Station, for Universal Studios Japan